Zabya Khamis al-Muslimani (born 1958) is an Emirati poet and short story writer.

Al-Muslimani was born in Dubai. From 1975 until 1980 she studied philosophy, political science, and literature at Indiana University; from 1982 to 1989 she studied in London. She was arrested and jailed in Abu Dhabi in 1987 for publishing "transgressive poetry"; as a result, she has lived in Egypt since 1989. Her writing has been anthologized in English.

References

1958 births
Living people
20th-century Emirati poets
Emirati short story writers
20th-century short story writers
21st-century Emirati poets
21st-century short story writers
People from Dubai
Indiana University alumni
Emirati expatriates in Egypt
21st-century Emirati writers
21st-century Emirati women writers
20th-century Emirati writers
20th-century Emirati women writers
Emirati women poets